Shir Mahalleh may refer to:
 Shir Mahalleh, Gilan
 Shir Mahalleh, Mazandaran